"Dangerous Love" is a single by English-Ghanaian recording artist Fuse ODG, featuring Jamaican singer Sean Paul. The song was released in the United Kingdom as a digital download on 18 May 2014. The song peaked at number 3 on the UK Singles Chart, number 4 on the Scottish Singles Chart and number 55 on the Irish Singles Chart.

"Dangerous Love" was nominated for Best Song at the MOBO Awards 2014, following his win in 2013 for Best African Act.

Charts

Weekly charts

Year-end charts

Certifications

Release history

References

2014 singles
2014 songs
Fuse ODG songs
Songs written by Sean Paul